The FIBA Europe is the governing body for Basketball in Europe along with the Euroleague Basketball Organization and the ULEB they organises Four main Active club competitions for men: the Euroleague (formerly European Cup), the EuroCup Basketball, FIBA Champions League and the FIBA Europe Cup. there is also another four former fiba europe club competition such as the FIBA Saporta Cup (1966–2002), FIBA Korać Cup (1971–2002), FIBA EuroCup Challenge (2002–2007) and FIBA EuroChallenge (2003–2015).
The European Basketball Club Super Cup and the FIBA SuproLeague are consider it as a Semi Official tournament by FIBA Europe and thus not included in this List. 
Spanish side Real Madrid have won a record total of 16 titles in European competitions, Six more than Basketball Cantù.

The Italian clubs have won the most titles (44), ahead of clubs from Spain (39) and Greece (18).

Winners

By club

The following table lists all the men's clubs that have won at least one European major club competition, and is updated as of 21 May 2022 (in chronological order).

Key

By country
The following table lists all the countries whose clubs have won at least one European major competition, and is updated as of 21 May 2022 (in chronological order).

Key

See also
FIBA Europe

References

External links
FIBA Europe Official Webpage

 

FIBA Europe
FIBA Europe club competition winners
Basketball statistics